The Murray Hill Elementary School was a public school in Chanute, Kansas.  It was listed on the National Register of Historic Places in 2011.

History
It is a two-story U-shaped structure which was built during 1951–52.

It was built on the site of the 1887 first school in Chanute, which was replaced in 1902 after a fire in 1901.  In 1951 the present building was designed by Topeka architects Williamson & Loebsack.  It reflected Modern Movement architecture.  It was used to the end of the 2008–2009 school year when Chanute USD 413 public school district built a school on the outskirts of Chanute to consolidate three separate elementary schools.

References

External links
 Chanute students treated to new facilities - Chanute Tribune - May 2, 2009

School buildings on the National Register of Historic Places in Kansas
Schools in Kansas
Buildings and structures completed in 1952
Neosho County, Kansas